Kevin McMahon may refer to:

Kevin McMahon (athlete) (born 1972), American retired track and field athlete
Kevin McMahon (footballer, born 1946), English former footballer
Kevin McMahon (Australian footballer) (1930–2022), Australian rules footballer
Kevin McMahon (Gaelic footballer) (born 1982), Irish Gaelic footballer
Kevin McMahon (musician) (born 1953), American musician, singer, and songwriter
Kevin McMahon (rower) (born 1938), Australian Olympic rower
Kevin R. McMahon (born 1962), American conductor and composer
J. Kevin McMahon, president and CEO of the Pittsburgh Cultural Trust